Xu Nannan (徐囡囡; born August 16, 1977) is a Chinese freestyle skier and Olympic medalist. She received a silver medal at the 1998 Winter Olympics in Nagano, in aerials.

She participated at the 1996 Asian Winter Games in Harbin, where she received a silver medal.

References

1977 births
Living people
Freestyle skiers at the 1998 Winter Olympics
Freestyle skiers at the 2002 Winter Olympics
Freestyle skiers at the 2006 Winter Olympics
Olympic silver medalists for China
Chinese female freestyle skiers
Olympic freestyle skiers of China
Olympic medalists in freestyle skiing
Skiers from Liaoning
People from Benxi
Medalists at the 1998 Winter Olympics
Asian Games medalists in freestyle skiing
Freestyle skiers at the 1996 Asian Winter Games
Asian Games silver medalists for China
Medalists at the 1996 Asian Winter Games